Periwinkle is a color in the blue and violet family. Its name is derived from the lesser periwinkle or myrtle herb (Vinca minor) which bears flowers of the same color.

The color periwinkle is also called lavender blue and light blue violet. The color periwinkle may be considered a pale tint of purple or blue, or a "pastel purple".

The first recorded use of periwinkle as a color name in English was in 1922.

In popular culture 

 Periwinkle blue is the color for esophageal and stomach cancer awareness ribbons, and for anorexia nervosa and bulimia. It is also the color for pulmonary hypertension awareness ribbons.
 Periwinkle was added to the Crayola palette in 1958. 
 Periwinkle is the official color for k-pop group f(x)'s fandom
 In Harry Potter and the Goblet of Fire (book), Hermione Granger wears a periwinkle blue dress to the Yule Ball.
 In the late 1990s the Anaheim Angels changed their uniform to include this color.
 In the 1960 horror film Psycho and its 1998 remake it is mentioned that Norma Bates was buried in a periwinkle blue dress. 
 In the I Love Lucy series of episodes in which the Ricardos and the Mertzes drive cross-country from New York City to Hollywood, the car they drove was a two-tone 1955 Pontiac with the upper color being periwinkle blue.
 A periwinkle-colored kitten named Periwinkle is a character from the Blue's Clues franchise.

See also
Lavender (color)
 Shades of blue
List of colors

References

Shades of blue
Shades of violet